The UK Singles Chart is one of many music charts compiled by the Official Charts Company that calculates the best-selling singles of the week in the United Kingdom. Since 2004 the chart has been based on the sales of both physical singles and digital downloads, with airplay figures excluded from the official chart. This list shows singles that peaked in the Top 10 of the UK Singles Chart during 2005, as well as singles which peaked in 2004 and 2006 but were in the top 10 in 2005. The entry date is when the song appeared in the top 10 for the first time (week ending, as published by the Official Charts Company, which is six days after the chart is announced).

Two hundred and twenty-eight singles were in the top ten in 2005. Ten singles from 2004 remained in the top 10 for several weeks at the beginning of the year, while "When I'm Gone" by Eminem was released in 2005 but did not reach its peak until 2006. Fifty-two artists scored multiple entries in the top 10 in 2005.  Akon, Arctic Monkeys, James Blunt, Kaiser Chiefs and The Pussycat Dolls were among the many artists who achieved their first UK charting top 10 single in 2005.

To mark Elvis Presley's 70th birthday, all eighteen of his UK number-one singles were re-released. The first single, "All Shook Up", came with a collectors' box that made it ineligible to chart again; each of the other seventeen reissues hit the UK top 5. Two of the three re-released singles which topped the chart - "One Night"/"I Got Stung" and "It's Now or Never" - were also the first and second singles in chart history to spend their only week in the top 10 at number-one before dropping out.

The 2004 Christmas number-one, "Do They Know It's Christmas?" by Band Aid 20, remained at number-one for the first week of 2005. The first new number-one single of the year was "Against All Odds" by 2004 X Factor winner Steve Brookstein. Overall, twenty-eight different singles peaked at number-one in 2005, with Elvis Presley (3) having the most singles hit that position.

Background

Elvis Presley sets chart records
Elvis Presley set several chart records in 2005. With a selection of his back-catalogue (all his UK number-one singles) being reissued to mark what would have been the late singer's 70th birthday, his seventeen entries were the most by any artist in the same year. It remains a record as of 2018, with Ed Sheeran's 2017 haul of eleven top 10s in a calendar year the closest anyone has come since (Sheeran had seventeen singles in the top 20 that year).

On 16 January 2005 (22 January 2005, week ending), the re-release of Presley's 1959 chart-topper "One Night"/"I Got Stung" became the 1000th number-one in the UK Singles Chart. "One Night"/"I Got Stung" also became one of the first singles to drop out of the top 10 entirely the week after topping the chart. The feat was repeated by another Presley classic, “It's Now or Never”, with its only week in the top ten spent on top of the chart. “Baby's Coming Back”/Transylvania” by McFly (2007) was the next single to join Presley on the list.

Multiple entries
Two hundred and twenty-eight singles charted in 2005, with two-hundred and seventeen singles reaching their peak this year (including the re-entry "Fairytale of New York" and a series of Elvis Presley re-releases which charted in previous years but reached a peak on their latest chart run). Cabin Crew and Sunset Strippers both reached the charts with a remixed version of "Waiting for a Star to Fall", under the title "Star to Fall" and "Falling Stars" respectively.

Fifty-two artists scored multiple entries in the top 10 in 2005. Elvis Presley had the most top ten singles in 2005 with seventeen in total. All the singles had been UK number-ones for Presley and they were re-released to mark what would have been his 70th birthday. Three of the singles peaked at number-one: "Jailhouse Rock" and "One Night"/"I Got Stung" in January (the 1000th number-one in the UK Singles Chart), and "It's Now or Never" in February. "A Fool Such As I"/"I Need Your Love Tonight", "Are You Lonesome Tonight?", "Wooden Heart", "Surrender", "Good Luck Charm", "(You're the) Devil in Disguise", "Crying in the Chapel" and "Way Down" all reached a high of number two in 2005. Of his other entries, "His Latest Flame"/"Little Sister", "Rock-A-Hula Baby"/"Can't Help Falling in Love", "She's Not You" and "A Little Less Conversation" each charted at number three, while "The Wonder of You" (4) and "Return to Sender" (5) completed his haul.

50 Cent and Girls Aloud both recorded five top ten hit singles this year. The former spent eleven weeks in the top 10 with his five entries, which included a collaboration on The Game's number four single "Hate It or Love It". "Candy Shop" peaked at the same position, while he had another feature on another song with The Game, "How We Do", which reached number five. "Outta Control Remix" landed at number seven and "Just a Lil Bit" squeezed into the top ten.

Girls Aloud's "I'll Stand by You" originally charted at number-one at the end of 2004 in support of Children in Need and spent a couple more weeks near the top of the chart in January 2005. "Wake Me Up" was their next hit when it reached number four in March. "Long Hot Summer" took seventh spot in September, "Biology" was another number four entry and they finished the year with "See the Day" peaking at number ten.

Chris Martin and Bono's four top ten hits include their vocals on Band Aid 20 at the end of 2004. Martin had three top tens with his band Coldplay in 2005 - "Speed of Sound" (2), "Fix You" (4) and "Talk" (10). Similarly, Bono's other successful singles were as part of U2, the best performing being the number-one single "Sometimes You Can't Make It On Your Own" in February. "City of Blinding Lights" (2) just missed the top spot in June and "All Because of You" in October peaked at number four.

American rapper Eminem also had four top ten hits in the UK across 2005. "Like Toy Soldiers" became the sixth number-one single of his career in February, after "The Real Slim Shady", "Stan" (both 2000), "Without Me", "Lose Yourself" (both 2002) and "Just Lose It" (2004). "Ass Like That", "Mockingbird" and "When I'm Gone" all reached number four. The final act with four entries in 2005 were McFly. Charity single for Comic Relief, "All About You"/"You've Got a Friend", and "I'll Be OK" both topped the chart, while "I Wanna Hold You" made number three. They ended the year with number 9 hit "Ultraviolet"/"The Ballad of Paul K".

Girl group Sugababes was one of a number of artists with three top-ten entries, including number one "Push the Button". Akon, Ciara, Kaiser Chiefs, Oasis, Robbie Williams and The White Stripes were among the other artists who had multiple top 10 entries in 2005.

Chart debuts
Seventy artists achieved their first top 10 single in 2005, either as a lead or featured artist. Of these, four went on to record another hit single that year: Bloc Party, Crazy Frog, Goldfrapp and The Pussycat Dolls. Akon, Ciara, The Game and Kaiser Chiefs all had two other entries in their breakthrough year.

The following table (collapsed on desktop site) does not include acts who had previously charted as part of a group and secured their first top 10 solo single.  

Notes
One World Project featured several artists who had previously charted in their own right as solo artists, including Boy George, Cliff Richard, Robin Gibb and Russell Watson. Many other participants had only reached the top 10 in the line-up of their bands, namely Barry Gibb (Bee Gees), Bill Wyman (The Rolling Stones), Brian Wilson (The Beach Boys), Célena Cherry (Honeyz), Dewey Bunnell and Gerry Beckley (both America), Jon Anderson and Rick Wakeman (both Yes), Kenney Jones (Small Faces, Faces and The Who) and Steve Winwood (The Spencer Davis Group). The Tears was made up of ex-Suede members Brett Anderson and Bernard Butler, who had had a string of top 10 hits with their previous band but debuted with their new project in 2005.

Fightstar included Charlie Simpson, formerly of Busted, whose previous top 10 singles included "Crashed the Wedding", "Year 3000" and "Who's David". Simpson's former bandmate James Bourne formed Son of Dork after the band split and charted at number 3 with "Ticket Outta Loserville". Lee Ryan made his solo debut outside Blue when "Army of Lovers" reached number 3 in the chart. Bandmate Simon Webbe had two top 10 singles in 2005, "Lay Your Hands" and "No Worries" both peaking at number four.

British Whale was a solo project by Justin Hawkins of The Darkness who had debuted with "I Believe in a Thing Called Love" in 2003. Friday Hill was made up of three members of the successful collective Blazin' Squad: Flava, Kenzie and Strider. Edmée Daenen of the band DHT's was credited separately on the cover of "Listen to Your Heart".

Songs from films
Original songs from various films entered the top 10 throughout the year. These included "Jailhouse Rock" (from Jailhouse Rock), "1 Thing (from Hitch) and "These Boots Are Made for Walkin'" (The Dukes of Hazzard). "Long Hot Summer" was also recorded for Herbie: Fully Loaded but never made the soundtrack.

Charity singles
A number of singles recorded for charity reached the top 10 in the charts in 2005. The Comic Relief single was the double-A side "All About You"/"You've Got a Friend" by McFly, peaking at number-one on 19 March 2005.

A second single was released in aid of Comic Relief, a re-release of Tony Christie's "(Is This the Way to) Amarillo", featuring comedian Peter Kay, who shot a music video featuring various celebrities and was credited on the release. It topped the charts on 26 March 2005 and spent eleven weeks in the top 10, including seven at number-one.

Liberty X recorded the Children in Need single for 2005, "A Night to Remember". It was the eighth top 10 single of their career and reached number six on 26 November 2005.

Band Aid 20's "Do They Know It's Christmas?", first released in 2004, also spent several weeks in the top 10 at the beginning of the year, having peaked at number-one on 11 December 2004.

Best-selling singles
Tony Christie featuring Peter Kay had the best-selling single of the year with "(Is This the Way to) Amarillo". The song spent eleven weeks in the top 10 (including seven weeks at number one), sold over 1.1 million copies and was certified 2× platinum by the BPI (July 2013). "That's My Goal" by Shayne Ward came in second place, selling more than 874,000 copies and losing out by around 226,000 sales. Crazy Frog's "Axel F", "You're Beautiful" from James Blunt and "Don't Cha" by The Pussycat Dolls featuring Busta Rhymes made up the top five. Singles by McFly, Akon Madonna, Westlife and Sugababes were also in the top ten best-selling singles of the year.

"(Is This the Way to) Amarillo" (3) and "That's My Goal" (8) were both ranked in the top 10 best-selling singles of the decade.

Top-ten singles
Key

Entries by artist

The following table shows artists who achieved two or more top 10 entries in 2005, including singles that reached their peak in 2004 or 2006. The figures include both main artists and featured artists, while appearances on ensemble charity records are also counted for each artist. The total number of weeks an artist spent in the top ten in 2005 is also shown.

Notes

 "Tilt Ya Head Back" re-entered the top 10 at number 9 on 8 January 2005 (week ending).
 Released as a charity single by Band Aid 20 to aid the Darfur region in Sudan.
 Elvis Presley's 18 UK number-one singles were re-released each week, some as double A-sides, throughout 2005. 17 of them entered the UK Singles Chart, all making the top five, with three of them reaching number-one.
 Released in support of victims of the 2004 Asian tsunami.
 Released as an official single for Comic Relief.
 The JXL remix originally reached number-one in 2002.
 Ying Yang Twins are credited as featured artist on "Get Low". Usher and Ludacris are credited for "Lovers and Friends".
 "Jacques Your Body (Make Me Sweat)" was originally released in 1997 and then again in 1999. It was used in an advert for Citroën C4 in 2005 and subsequently released as a single.
 Released as the official single for Children in Need.
 "Ugly" re-entered the top 10 at number 8 on 7 January 2006 (week ending), rising to number 7 the following week.
 Figure includes appearances on The Game's "Hate It or Love It" and "How We Do".
 Figure includes song that peaked in 2004.
 Figure includes an appearance on the "Do They Know It's Christmas?" charity single by Band Aid 20.
 Figure includes three top 10 singles with the group U2.
 Figure includes song that peaked in 2006.
 Figure includes three top 10 hits with the group Coldplay.
 Figure includes appearance on Pharrell's "Can I Have It Like That".
 Figure includes one top 10 hit with the group British Whale and one top 10 hit with the group The Darkness.
 Figure includes appearance on 2Pac's "Ghetto Gospel".
 Figure includes appearance on Ciara's "1, 2 Step".
 Figure includes credit for featuring on Lil Jon & The East Side Boyz's "Lovers and Friends".
 "Fairytale of New York" first charted at its original peak of number 2 for two weeks in 1987. It re-entered the Top 10 on 31 December 2005 (week ending) at number 3.

See also
2005 in British music
List of number-one singles from the 2000s (UK)

References
General

Specific

External links
2005 singles chart archive at the Official Charts Company (click on relevant week)

United Kingdom Top Ten
2005 in British music
2005